Nizhnebezymyansky is a rural locality (a khutor) in Dobrinskoye Rural Settlement, Uryupinsky District, Volgograd Oblast, Russia. The population was 10 as of 2010.

Geography 
Nizhnebezymyansky is located in forest steppe, 25 km west of Uryupinsk (the district's administrative centre) by road. Dobrinka is the nearest rural locality.

References 

Rural localities in Uryupinsky District